
Year 593 (DXCIII) was a common year starting on Thursday (link will display the full calendar) of the Julian calendar. The denomination 593 for this year has been used since the early medieval period, when the Anno Domini calendar era became the prevalent method in Europe for naming years.

Events 
 By place 

 Byzantine Empire 
 Spring – Priscus, commander-in-chief in Thrace, defeats the Slavic tribes and Gepids on Byzantine territory south of the Danube. He crosses the river to fight in the uncharted swamps and forests of modern-day Wallachia.
 Autumn – Emperor Maurice orders Priscus to spend the winter with his troops on the northern Danube bank, but he disobeys the emperor's order and retreats to the port city of Odessus (Varna) on the Black Sea Coast.

 Britain 
 Æthelfrith of Northumbria succeeds Hussa as king of Bernicia (Scotland). His accession possibly involves dynastic rivalry and the exile of Hussa's relatives. 
 Pybba succeeds his father Creoda as king of Mercia (approximate date).

 Persia 
 The Persian usurper Hormizd V (who rises temporarily to power) is defeated by King Khosrau II.

 Asia 
 Empress Suiko begins a long reign during a pivotal period, in which Buddhism influences the development and culture of Japan. She is the first female ruler and the first to receive official recognition from China.
 Suiko appoints her 21-year-old nephew Shōtoku as regent, with strongman Umako Soga. He holds shared power for nearly 30 years, creating the nation's first constitution (Seventeen-article constitution).

 By topic 
 Art 
 The Altar to Amitābha Buddha is made during the Sui Dynasty. It is now kept at the Museum of Fine Arts, Boston.

 Religion 
 Anastasius I is restored as patriarch of Antioch, after Gregory dies.
 The Shitennō-ji monastery is founded at Osaka (Japan) by Shōtoku.

Births 
 Jomei, emperor of Japan (d. 641)
 Zaynab bint Jahsh, wife of Muhammad (d. 641)

Deaths 
 Ceawlin, king of Wessex (approximate date)
 Creoda, king of Mercia (approximate date)
 Eberigisil, bishop of Cologne (approximate date)
 Gregory, patriarch of Antioch (approximate date)
 Hussa, king of Bernicia (approximate date)
 Ino Anastasia, Byzantine empress consort
 Paul, father of Maurice (approximate date)

References